Ahmed al-Ghubrini was a scholar, chronicler, biographer and qadi born in Bejaia in 1264 and originally from Djurdjura.

He was born in the year 1264 in Bejaia and was the son of Aba Al-Qasim Ahmed Al-Ghubrini,  a scholar who took over the fatwa in Tunisia. He attended seminars in the great mosque of Bejaia and the Zitouna mosque. He was able to gain knowledge from many scholars including Abu Muhammad Abd al-Haq al-Ansari al-Baja'i, Abu al-Faris Abd al-Aziz Ibn Makhlouf, Abu Abdullah al-Tamimi al-Qalai, Muhammad al-Umayyi, Abu Abdullah al-Kinani al-Shatibi and Abu al-Hasan al-Azdi. His book 'Unwan al-diraya fi man 'urifa min al-'ulama'fi l-mi'a al-sabi'afi Bijaya [Ornament of knowledge on those known scholars of Bejaïa in the seventh century AH] was translated by 149 scholars.

References

Algerian scholars
1264 births
1314 deaths